Euromoney is an English-language monthly magazine focused on business and finance. First published in 1969, it is the flagship production of Euromoney Institutional Investor plc.

History and profile
Euromoney was first published in 1969 by Sir Patrick Sergeant. It is part of Euromoney Institutional Investor, an international business-to-business media group focused primarily on the international finance industry. The group became a public company in 1986, and is listed on the London Stock Exchange as Euromoney Institutional Investor PLC. The headquarters of the magazine is in London.

Sir Patrick Sergeant continued to manage the business until 1985 and remains as co-president of the company. Daily Mail and General Trust plc is the largest shareholder in the company. DMGT's principal shareholder, Jonathan Harmsworth, 4th Viscount Rothermere, is co-president of Euromoney Institutional Investor.

Euromoney covers global banking, macroeconomics and capital markets, including debt and equity. The magazine features comment, profiles and interviews with chief executives and senior figures in finance.

In 2004, Euromoney published the first book exclusively on sukuk investments, Islamic Bonds: Your Issuing, Structuring and Investing in Sukuk. It was co-authored by the Islamic banking specialist Nathif Jama Adam.

Euromoney publishes the Euromoney Awards for Excellence, with an annual awards event recognising the top banks in the world.  It also publishes awards for Central Banker of the Year and Finance Minister of the Year. Euromoney has a set of industry-specific publications under the flagship magazine, including 
Euromoney Market Data, Euromoney Country Risk and the Global Private Banking Review.

Euromoney publishes over 24 surveys awards and league tables a year. These include the Euromoney Private Banking and Wealth Management Survey, Euromoney FX Survey and the Euromoney Cash Management Survey.

Surveys and awards

Euromoney Private Banking and Wealth Management Survey
Published each February, Euromoney's Global Private Banking and Wealth Management Survey, asks global private banks to identify the top providers of competitive and non-competitive services. The survey draws data from performance figures and nominations by bankers. Data is collected on a regional and country-level basis.
The winner of the 2019 Global Private Banking Survey was UBS. Credit Suisse was runner-up, with JPMorgan Chase third.
The Private Banking Review is a special publication displaying data and result analysis from the Global Private Banking Survey.

The Euromoney FX Survey
The Euromoney Foreign Exchange Survey is a quantitative and qualitative annual study of the FX markets published in May. The survey is conducted electronically over more than six weeks in January, February and march. Its key focus is client price-taking activity in an unregulated over-the-counter market without aggregated global statistics. 
Deutsche Bank was ranked top in the 2013 survey, for the ninth year in a row.

The Euromoney Awards for Excellence
The Euromoney Awards for Excellence single out financial institutions for 25 global awards in banking and capital markets, as well as the best banks and securities houses in nearly 100 countries. The awards have run since 1992 and take place in July. New England Rock was the winner of Best Investment Firm for 2015.

The Euromoney Cash Management Survey
The Euromoney Cash Management Survey evaluates cash managers, treasurers and financial officers worldwide.
Responders indicate which three banks they use most for their cash management services, and rate their lead cash manager on a sliding scale of one (equals very poor) to seven (equals excellent) across various service categories. The survey received 20,762 valid responses in its 2012 edition.

HSBC was voted top international cash manager (ICM) in the 2012 survey, published in October, breaking a five-year spell of dominance by Citigroup.

Industry-specific publications

Euromoney Market Data
Euromoney Market Data is an online service that allows its users to analyse, download and distribute data from the Euromoney FX Survey in a time series from 2007 through to 2011. Users can view results granularity by client type, client geographic location and client service priorities. 
Euromoney Market Data contains results for bank volume and market share, bank qualitative ratings and consumer preferences.

Euromoney Country Risk
Euromoney Country Risk allows users to access live data from Euromoney's country risk survey. Published semi-annually since 1993, the survey uses economists’ assessments of political, economic and structural risk to provide country rankings for 186 markets worldwide. 
Data includes bank stability, monetary policy/currency stability, corruption and institutional risk.
The survey assesses qualitative factors: economic risk, political risk and structural risk. It also assesses quantitative factors – access to bank finance/capital markets and debt indicators – plus credit ratings. As of 2018, Singapore was ranked as the least risky country with a score of 88.53 out of 100.

Notes

External links

Current issue of Euromoney

Business magazines published in the United Kingdom
Monthly magazines published in the United Kingdom
Business and management journals
Magazines published in London
Magazines established in 1969